The seventh season of the American television series The Masked Singer (also known as The Masked Singer: The Good, The Bad, and The Cuddly) premiered on Fox on March 9, 2022, following a sneak peek episode that aired on February 20, and concluded on May 18, 2022. The season was won by singer/songwriter Teyana Taylor as "Firefly", with actor/singer Hayley Orrantia finishing second as "Ringmaster", and actor/singer Cheyenne Jackson placing third as "Prince".

Panelists and host 

Nick Cannon, singer-songwriter Robin Thicke, television and radio personality Jenny McCarthy Wahlberg, actor and comedian Ken Jeong, and recording artist Nicole Scherzinger all returned as host and panelists.

Guest panelists in the season included Eric Stonestreet in the second episode, Nicole Byer in the fifth episode, and Leslie Jordan in the sixth episode.

Unlike the previous three seasons, there were no first impression guesses made by the panelists, and the Golden Ear Trophy was not awarded for the first time since its introduction in the fourth season.

Contestants 
The season features 15 contestants split into three teams known as "The Good", "The Bad", and "The Cuddly". This is the first season since the fourth season not to feature wild card contestants, but also being the first to feature teams.

"Hydra" is the first three-headed costume in the series while also sporting three legs due to its portrayers as well as featuring smoke-breathing features and a large size. "Cyclops" is the largest costume to date.

Episodes

Week 1 (March 9)

Week 2 (March 16)

Week 3 (March 23)
 Group performance: "I Got You (I Feel Good)" by James Brown

Week 4 (March 30)

Week 5 (April 6)

Week 6 (April 13)
 Group performance: "One Way or Another" by Blondie

Week 7 (April 20)

Week 8 (April 27)

Week 9 (May 4)
 Group performance: "Roar" by Katy Perry

Week 10 (May 18)

Ratings

Controversy 
Reports prior to the season premiere identified that controversial figure Rudy Giuliani was one of the masked performers during this season, reportedly in one of the first episodes taped. Giuliani's unmasking reportedly prompted panelists Jeong and Thicke to storm off the set as an act of protest, though later reports indicated that Thicke only left to check on Jeong. After Giuliani was not unmasked in the premiere episode, a Fox Entertainment vice president told Newsweek, "...like most productions, the groups are not necessarily taped sequentially, so we don't always know the order they will air," with Newsweek adding on that his appearance was not cut from the show. The unmasking later occurred in the seventh episode broadcast, showing the panelists' surprised reactions, as well as Jeong quietly walking off during Giuliani's unmasked performance. Prior to walking away, Jeong can be seen visibly upset at this reveal, has his arms crossed, and does not partake in the elimination interview. The casting was widely criticized, and was considered by Wired as a poorly-executed ratings grab, as the episode saw a significant drop in viewership compared to prior episodes in the season. Rob Wade, Fox's vice president of alternative entertainment, said that they were pleased with choice to include Giuliani as the show "is all about delivering jaw dropping moments", and was only disappointed that sources leaked the reveal early.

Notes

References 

2022 American television seasons
The Masked Singer (American TV series)